Hillcrest Academy  is a residential treatment program licensed in 2012 by the Ohio Department of Jobs and Family Services and operated by Rite of Passage (ROP) in partnership with the Hamilton County Juvenile Court and Probation Department.  Hillcrest Academy serves male youth between the ages of 12–18 with a history of delinquent behaviors, mild mental health issues and special education needs.

Background
Hillcrest School traces its roots back to 1850 when the City of Cincinnati opened a school for delinquent boys and girls.  When the city ran into financial issues running the separate boys and girls schools, the Hamilton County Welfare Board and Cincinnati Public Schools jointly took over in the late 1930s.  In the late 1970s, a new facility was built and the Hamilton County Juvenile Court took over authority.

Academics
Hillcrest serves approximately 70 students predominantly from Hamilton County. Class sizes are small and never exceed ten students. Hillcrest offers Science, History, Math, and English courses that are required and count towards high school graduation in the state of Ohio. Hillcrest has also offers career and technical training courses which include culinary, sports medicine, as well as first aid and CPR. Hillcrest is also equipped with a guidance counselor to ensure that the students are on track to graduate.

Athletics
Hillcrest offers two sports each during fall, winter, and spring. Hillcrest offers Football, Cross Country, Basketball, Wrestling, and Tennis. Hillcrest competes against both private and public high schools from the Cincinnati, Dayton, and Northern Kentucky area.

References

External links
 Hillcrest Academy

High schools in Hamilton County, Ohio
Educational institutions established in 1850
Public high schools in Ohio